Macarthur Football Club is an Australian professional association football club based in South West Sydney, Australia. The club was formed in 2017 as Macarthur South West United before it was renamed to Macarthur FC.

Managers
 Manager dates and nationalities are sourced from WorldFootball.net. Statistics are sourced from ALeagueStats.com. Names of caretaker managers are supplied where known, and periods of caretaker management are highlighted in italics and marked  or  depending on the scenario. Win percentage is rounded to two decimal places.
 Only first-team competitive matches are counted. Wins, losses and draws are results at the final whistle; the results of penalty shoot-outs are not counted.
 Statistics are complete up to and including the match played in 28 January 2023.

Key
M = matches played; W = matches won; D = matches drawn; L = matches lost; GF = Goals for; GA = Goals against; Win % = percentage of total matches won
  Managers with this background and symbol in the "Name" column are italicised to denote caretaker appointments.
  Managers with this background and symbol in the "Name" column are italicised to denote caretaker appointments promoted to full-time manager.

Notes

References
General
 

Specific

Managers
Lists of soccer managers by club in Australia
Sydney-sport-related lists